Jean-François Jalkh (born 23 May 1957) is a French politician who is the current Member of the European Parliament for the National Rally, representing East France.

On 25 April 2017, after the resignation of Marine Le Pen as leader of the National Front, Jalkh was named as the interim leader. He stepped down three days later, on April 28, after being heavily criticised on comments made about Nazi extermination camps (see below). He was replaced by Steeve Briois as Interim Leader.

He is known for his "vieille garde" (old guard) views, relating to the pre-de-demonisation platform of the FN, such as calling the use of Zyklon B in the Holocaust "technically impossible" and opposing the expulsion of Jean-Marie Le Pen from the Front National.

References

1957 births
Living people
People from Tournan-en-Brie
French people of Lebanese descent
Politicians from Île-de-France
Deputies of the 8th National Assembly of the French Fifth Republic
National Rally (France) MEPs
MEPs for East France 2014–2019
MEPs for France 2019–2024
French Holocaust deniers
National Rally (France) politicians